The 2014–15 Lebanese Premier League was the 54th season of top-tier football in Lebanon. A total of twelve teams are competing in the league, with Al Nejmeh the defending champions. The season kicked off on 26 September 2014 and will finish around June 2015.

Al Ahed won the league, while Tadamon Sour and Al-Akhaa Al-Ahli Aley were relegated to the second tier.

Teams 
Al-Mabarrah and Al Egtmaaey Tripoli were relegated to the second level of Lebanese football after ending the 2013–14 season in the bottom two places. They were replaced by Nabi Sheet and Shabab Al-Ghazieh. Shabab Al-Ghazieh return after one season away whilst Nabi Sheet enter for the first time

Stadia and locations

Table

League table

References

2014–15 Lebanese Premier League
Lebanese Premier League seasons
Leb
1